The Tsutomu Kanai Award was established by the IEEE Computer Society in 1997 by an endowment from Hitachi Ltd., and named in honor of Dr. Tsutomu Kanai, who served as Hitachi’s president for 30 years.  The Kanai Award may be presented annually upon the recommendation of the Kanai Award subcommittee, endorsement of the Awards Committee and approval of the Board of Governors. The Kanai Award recognized major contributions to the state-of-the-art distributed computing systems and their applications. The award consisted of a crystal model, a certificate, and $10,000.

In the evaluation process, the following criteria were considered:  seminal nature of the achievements, practical impact, breadth and depth of contributions, and quality of the nomination. Ken Thompson was the first Tsutomu Award winner in 1999 and Beng Chin Ooi was the last, in 2012. The award was discontinued afterwards.

List of recipients
 2012 Beng Chin Ooi
 2011 Ian Foster
 2009 Kenneth P. Birman
 2008 Benjamin W. Wah
 2007 Willy Zwaenepoel
 2006 Larry Smarr
 2005 Elisa Bertino
 2004 Kane Kim
 2003 James Gosling
 2002 Stephen S. Yau
 2001 Alfred Z. Spector
 2000 C. V. Ramamoorthy
 1999 Ken Thompson

See also 

 List of computer science awards

External links
 

Computer science awards
IEEE society and council awards
Awards established in 1997
Awards disestablished in 2012